Yasin Arslan (born 23 July 1978) is a Turkish male weightlifter, competing in the 69 kg category and representing Turkey at international competitions. He participated at the 2000 Summer Olympics in the 69 kg event. He competed at world championships, most recently at the 2007 World Weightlifting Championships.

Major results

References

1978 births
Living people
Turkish male weightlifters
Weightlifters at the 2000 Summer Olympics
Olympic weightlifters of Turkey
Place of birth missing (living people)
World Weightlifting Championships medalists
Mediterranean Games silver medalists for Turkey
Mediterranean Games medalists in weightlifting
Competitors at the 2005 Mediterranean Games
20th-century Turkish people
21st-century Turkish people